Lightning is a 1927 American silent Western film directed by James C. McKay and starring Jobyna Ralston, Robert Frazer and Margaret Livingston. It is based on a short story of the same title by Zane Grey.

Cast
 Jobyna Ralston as Mary Warren / Topsy
 Robert Frazer as Lee Stewart 
 Margaret Livingston as Dot Deal
 Guinn 'Big Boy' Williams as Cuth Stewart 
 Pat Harmon as 'Simon'
 Lightning the Horse as Lightning the Horse
 Lady Bess as Lady Bess the Horse

References

Bibliography
 Connelly, Robert B. The Silents: Silent Feature Films, 1910-36, Volume 40, Issue 2. December Press, 1998.
 Munden, Kenneth White. The American Film Institute Catalog of Motion Pictures Produced in the United States, Part 1. University of California Press, 1997.

External links
 

1927 films
1927 adventure films
1927 Western (genre) films
1920s English-language films
American silent feature films
American adventure films
Silent American Western (genre) films
Films directed by James C. McKay
American black-and-white films
Tiffany Pictures films
Films set in Chicago
Films set in Utah
Silent adventure films
1920s American films